The Marshalltown trowel is an excavation implement used by archaeologists in the United States of America and elsewhere.

Manufactured by the Marshalltown Company of Marshalltown, Iowa, the trowel was first introduced in the 1890s. The patent for its handle was first filed by Marshalltown Trowel Company on July 12, 1927, and granted December 23, 1930. The Marshalltown trowel is made of a single piece of metal. The 5-inch and 6-inch pointing trowels are most often used for archaeology. It is larger and more flexible than the WHS trowel preferred by archaeologists in the United Kingdom, which makes it better for cleaning sections but less well-suited to digging heavy clay and gravel deposits. It is used by bricklayers in the United Kingdom.

A 1982 American Anthropologist article, "The Golden Marshalltown: A Parable for the Archeology of the 1980s," relates an exchange between a younger version of an American archaeologist Kent V. Flannery and an experienced older archaeologist. The "Old Timer" likens an archaeologist's first trowel to "a major leaguer's first Wilson glove." According to the Old Timer, his trowel has accompanied him to many famous dig sites, such as Snaketown, Angel Mound, and the Dalles of the Columbia, and is now a legendary item in its own right. Within the greater article, the Old Timer and his trowel represent the "glory days" of American archaeology and stand in opposition to the pragmatic realities of "new" archaeology in the 1980s and beyond.

References

Methods in archaeology
Archaeology of the United States
Marshalltown, Iowa